The 2001–02 Volvo Ocean Race was the eighth edition of the around-the-world sailing event Volvo Ocean Race, and the first under the name Volvo Ocean Race. For the 2001–02 the sponsorship of the race was taken over by Volvo and Volvo Cars. The race was renamed the Volvo Ocean Race. Stopovers were added in Germany, France, and Sweden being the Volvo's three biggest car markets in Europe. In addition the points system had been modified significantly in an effort to keep the race competitive until the final leg. The previous "points" race having been effectively won two full legs before the final gun.

John Kostecki, who had co-skippered with George Collins on Chessie Racing in the 1997 to 1998 Whitbread to great effect, captained his first Volvo Ocean race winner in 2002. Assa Abloy's new composite mold technique proved very quick, but not quite quick enough, while long time Whitbread skipper Grant Dalton's two boat syndicate suffered badly from a lack of preparation time (the Amer boats were last in the water).

For Leg 3, yachts joined the iconic Australian 2001 Sydney to Hobart Yacht Race that begins on Boxing Day (the day after Christmas Day).

Participants

Lisa and Neal McDonald, skippers of rival boats, are husband and wife.

Route

Leg Results

Overall Results

References

External links
National Geographic's Volvo Ocean Race - National Geographic

The Ocean Race
Volvo Ocean Race, 2001-02
Volvo Ocean Race, 2001-02
2002 in New Zealand sport